Doolbi is a rural locality in the Bundaberg Region, Queensland, Australia.

Geography
Located just to the east of the town of Childers, Doolbi is bordered to the south by the Bruce Highway. The land in Doolbi is almost entirely used for farming with a small area of residential housing and the Isis Golf Course in the centre of the locality; there is no commercial development.

History
In 1890 the first sugar cane crushing mill in the Isis district was established at Doolbi. The mill produced juice, which was then taken to Yengarie for processing into sugar. In 1900, the Doolbi mill was upgraded to produce sugar. As more sugar mills opened in the district, there was not enough cane to keep them all profitable and the Doolbi mill closed in 1924. The mill was in the south-western corner of the present Isis Golf Course and an old brick chimney is still visible.

Horton State School opened circa 1888. In 1900, it was renamed Doolbi State School. It closed in 1953. It was at 204 Goodwood Road, now the site of the clubhouse of the Isis Golf Club.

Education 
There are no schools in Doolbi. The nearest primary and secondary schools are Childers State School and Isis District State High School, both in neighbouring Childers to the west.

References

External links

Bundaberg Region
Localities in Queensland